This article lists , non-legionary auxiliary regiments of the imperial Roman army, attested in the epigraphic record, by Roman province of deployment during the reign of emperor Hadrian ( AD 117–138).

The index of regimental names explains the origin of the names, most of which are based on the names of the subject tribes or cities of the empire where they were originally recruited. (As time went by, they became staffed by recruits from anywhere, especially from the province where they were deployed.)

Types of regiment 

During most of the Principate era, until AD 212, auxiliary regiments, called  by the Romans, were formations kept separate from the legions, who were recruited from Roman citizens only.  were mostly recruited from the peregrini, the vast majority of subjects in the Roman empire who did not hold Roman citizenship. (in AD 212, all the inhabitants of the empire were granted Roman citizenship).

There were three basic types of auxiliary regiment:
, which contained only cavalry and consisted nominally of 480 soldiers
 or simply , which contained only infantry and consisted nominally of 480 soldiers
, which contained infantry with an attached cavalry contingent and consisted nominally of 600 soldiers, of which 480 were infantry and 120 were cavalry

A number of regiments, of all three types, were designated  (sagitt), indicating that their members were equipped as archers. After about AD 80, about 12 percent of regiments were enlarged from the  size and designated , which nominally consisted of 1000 soldiers, but in reality consisted of 720 soldiers, 800 soldiers, and 1040 soldiers respectively.

Contents of tables 

Table I below lists auxiliary regiments during Hadrian's rule, for which there is the most comprehensive evidence. The table does not show regiments that were attested to in the 1st century but that, according to Holder, were dissolved by AD 117, nor those that were probably founded after AD 138. The precise number of regiments that existed during Hadrian's rule is disputed. The regiments are listed by the Roman province where they were deployed c. AD 130.
 Boldface entries: denotes a unit of double strength
 eq: denotes a part-mounted unit
 c.R: denotes a unit composed of Roman citizens
 sagitt: denotes a unit composed of archers

Ethnic composition of regiments 

The rule of the first emperor, Augustus, (30 BC–AD 14) saw the foundation of the majority of the regiments attested in Hadrian's time.

There is very little evidence concerning the organisation and policies of auxiliary recruitment. The ethnic origins of auxiliary recruits are attested in only a tiny fraction of cases. For example, the 
 must have recruited a calculated 8,000 soldiers over its probable lifespan of about 250 years but the origins of only two rankers are known. Conclusions about auxiliary recruitment drawn by scholars from the available evidence are regarded as tentative.

According to Holder, during the Julio-Claudian dynasty (AD 14–68), regimental ethnic identity was preserved to some extent, with evidence of continued recruitment from the original people. By the time of Hadrian, however, a regiment's name, in most cases, probably represented the ethnic origin of few, if any, of its members. This is because during the Flavian dynasty (AD 69–96), as a matter of deliberate policy, most regiments were deployed in provinces far from their original home and drew the majority of their recruits from local natives and the rest from all parts of the empire. In most cases, therefore, a regiment's name had become an identification tag devoid of ethnic significance. A regiment deployed long-term in the same province would thus, over time, acquire the ethnic character of its host population.

There are exceptions to this rule:
 A minority of regiments remained stationed in their original home province, e.g., still attested in Dalmatia in AD 130.
 Regiments founded a relatively short period before AD 130, for example  which was stationed in Roman Britain in AD 130 would probably still have contained mostly Dacian recruits at this time, as it had been established by Hadrian only about a decade earlier.
 Some specialised regiments, such as Syrian archers and the elite Batavi show some evidence of continued preferential recruitment from their original province.

List of  non-ethnic regimental names by province of deployment

Britannia

Germania Inferior

Germania Superior

Raetia/Noricum

Pannonia

Moesia Superior

Moesia Inferior

Dacia

Cappadocia

Syria Coele, Syria Phoenice, Syria Palestina (former Iudea) and Arabia Petraea

Aegyptus

Mauretania Tingitana, Mauretania Caesariensis, Numidia and Africa Proconsularis

Other locations

List of  ethnic regimental names

Glossary

Some regiments were named after other people, for example ala Sulpicia after its first, or early, . In the Augustan era, commanders of auxiliary units were often Roman legionary centurions, or native chieftains. For example,  was probably once commanded by a Gallic chieftain named Atectorix. Later, emperor Claudius restricted auxiliary commands to the lower aristocratic class of  only.

Imperial dedications

In the 4th century, Valeria referred to emperor Diocletian (r. AD 284–305) and Flavia to Constantine I (r. AD 312–337) or one of his successors.

Raised during the Illyrian revolt
Names of regiments originally raised by emperor Augustus during the Illyrian revolt (AD 6–9) from Roman citizens unsuitable for service in legions, such as vagrants, convicted criminals, debtors, and emancipated slaves:

After their initial recruitment of Roman citizens, these regiments recruited non-citizens like all other regiments.

Other non-ethnic regimental names

Unit Epithets
Some regiment names included additional descriptors:

See also

 Auxilia
 List of Roman legions

Notes

Citations

Sources

External links
 Roman auxiliary regiments from Dacia (KML file)

Military of ancient Rome
Roman auxiliaries